William Villiers may refer to:

William Villiers, 2nd Viscount Grandison (died 1643), English soldier of the Civil War
Sir William Villiers, 3rd Baronet (1645–1711), English member of parliament for Leicester
William Villiers, 2nd Earl of Jersey (died 1721), English member of parliament for Kent, later peer
William Villiers, 3rd Earl of Jersey (died 1769), English peer, a founding Governor of the Foundling Hospital
William Villiers, 10th Earl of Jersey (born 1976), British actor, writer, producer